Allbrook is an English surname. Notable people with this name include:

 Mark Allbrook, English first-class cricketer and school headmaster
 Nick Allbrook, Australian psychedelic rock musician, singer, songwriter

See also 
 

English-language surnames